is the third most common Japanese surname. Notable people with the surname include:

 Aaron Takahashi, American actor
 , Japanese singer and actress
 , Japanese kickboxer
 , Japanese classical pianist
 , Japanese art historian
 , Japanese baseball player
 , Japanese voice actress
 , Japanese badminton player
 , Japanese astronomer
 , Japanese badminton player
 Ayuo Takahashi (born 1960), Japanese-American musician
 , Japanese film director
 Belinda Takahashi, professor and creator of the Juno Baby product line
 Bo Takahashi (born 1997), Brazilian baseball player
 Bruna Takahashi (born 2000), Brazilian table tennis player
 , Japanese voice actress
 , Japanese politician
 , Japanese long-distance runner
 Chiyoko Takahashi (1912–1994), American lawyer
 , Japanese politician
 , Japanese footballer
 Daiji Takahashi (born 1977), Japanese mixed martial artist
 , Japanese figure skater
 , Japanese footballer
 Daisuke Takahashi (mathematician), Japanese mathematician
 , Japanese Nordic combined skier
 , Japanese racewalker
 Erina Takahashi, English ballerina
 , Japanese businessman
 , Japanese footballer
 , Japanese writer
 , Japanese professional wrestler
 , Japanese women's footballer
 , Japanese politician
 , Japanese billionaire real estate developer
 , Japanese baseball player
 , Japanese actor
 Hideko Takahashi, Japanese illustrator
 , Japanese footballer
 , Japanese footballer and manager
 , Japanese cross-country skier
 , Japanese actress and model
 , Japanese singer-songwriter and composer
 , Japanese judoka
 , Japanese skeleton racer
 , Japanese actor, voice actor and singer
 , Japanese cross-country skier
 , better known as Ao Takahashi, Japanese voice actress
 , better known as Kaoru Shimamura, Japanese voice actress
 , Japanese artist
 , Japanese professional wrestler
 , Japanese architect
 , Japanese manga artist
 , Japanese table tennis player
 , Japanese footballer
 , Japanese video game producer and designer
 , Japanese judge
 , Japanese baseball player
 , Japanese actress
 , Japanese singer
 , Imperial Japanese Navy admiral
 , Japanese drummer
 , Japanese botanist
 , Japanese footballer
 , Japanese actor
 Joseph Takahashi (born 1951), Japanese-American neurobiologist and geneticist
 , Japanese fashion designer
 , Japanese footballer
 , Japanese Singer and K-Pop idol from Rocket Punch
 , Imperial Japanese Navy officer
 , Japanese speed skater
 , Japanese actress
 , Japanese synchronized swimmer
 , Japanese actress and singer
 , Japanese voice actress
 Kasumi Takahashi (born 1980), Japanese-Australian rhythmic gymnast
 , Japanese writer
 , Japanese golfer
 , Japanese singer and actor
 Katsuya Takahashi, conspirator in the Sarin gas attack on the Tokyo subway
 , Japanese rugby union player
 , Japanese voice actress
 , Japanese sledge hockey player
 , Japanese manga artist and game creator
 , Japanese writer
 , Japanese baseball player
 , Japanese mixed martial artist
 , Japanese actor
 , Japanese luger
 , Japanese baseball player
 , Japanese actress
 , Japanese game designer and artist
 , Japanese manga artist
 , Japanese baseball player
 , Japanese long-distance runner
 , Japanese basketball player
 , Japanese footballer
 , Japanese footballer
 , Japanese sailor
 , Japanese futsal player
 , Japanese actor
 , Japanese volleyball player
 , Japanese footballer
 , Japanese swimmer
 , Japanese actor
 , Japanese baseball player
 , Japanese cyclist
 , Japanese journalist
 , Japanese politician and Prime Minister of Japan
 , Japanese motorcycle racer
 , Japanese volleyball player
 , Japanese animator and character designer
 , Japanese singer
 , Japanese writer
 , Japanese photojournalist
 , Japanese drifting driver
 , Japanese pool player
 , Japanese motorcycle racer and racing driver
 Kuniyuki Takahashi, Japanese DJ and music producer
 , Japanese actress and model
 , Japanese voice actor
 Mamoru Takahashi (born 1956), Japanese golfer
 , Japanese footballer
 , Japanese gymnast
 , Japanese model and actress
 , Japanese singer
 , Japanese actress and model
 , Japanese footballer
 , Japanese equestrian
 Masanori Takahashi, commonly known as Kitaro
 Masao Takahashi (born 1929), Canadian judoka
 , Japanese physician, ophthalmologist and stem cell researcher
 , Japanese cyclist
 , Japanese sailor
 Michael Takahashi (born 1974), Japanese-American basketball player
 , Japanese virologist
 , Japanese shogi player
 , Japanese volleyball player
 Migaku Takahashi, Japanese engineer
 , Japanese swimmer
 , Japanese voice actor and singer
 , Japanese voice actress and singer
 , Japanese singer, idol and actress
 , Japanese voice actress
 , Japanese actor
 , Japanese volleyball player
 , Japanese pentathlete
 , Japanese physician
 , Japanese sprinter
 , Japanese politician
 , Japanese poet
 , Japanese animator and anime director
 , 8th-century Japanese poet
 Mutsumi Takahashi, Canadian journalist
 , Japanese poet and writer
 , Japanese professional wrestler
 , Japanese footballer
 , Japanese artist
 , Japanese long-distance runner
 , Japanese footballer
 , Japanese singer and voice actor
 , Japanese footballer
 , Japanese figure skater
 , Japanese screenwriter
 Nobuko Takahashi (ambassador) Ambassador to Denmark 
 , Japanese footballer
 , Japanese murderer
 Phil Takahashi (born 1957), Canadian judoka
 , Japanese male volleyball player
 Ray Takahashi (born 1958), Canadian sport wrestler and judoka
 , Japanese baseball player
 , Japanese voice actress and singer
 , Japanese actress and voice actress
 , Japanese rower
 , Japanese manga artist
 , Japanese footballer
 , Japanese footballer
 , Japanese musician and composer
 , Japanese entomologist
 , Japanese biathlete
 , Japanese anime director, screenwriter, and producer
 , Japanese footballer
 , Japanese actor
 , Japanese naval aviator
 , Japanese women's footballer
 Sakae Takahashi, (19192001), Japanese American politician
 , Japanese footballer
 , Japanese international law scholar
 , Imperial Japanese Navy admiral
 , Japanese volleyball player
 , Japanese badminton player
 Satoshi Takahashi (born 1968), Japanese karateka
 , Japanese ice hockey player
 , Japanese swimmer
 , Japanese swimmer
 , Japanese footballer
 , Japanese samurai
 , Japanese manga artist
 , Japanese footballer and manager
 , Japanese baseball player
 , Japanese religious leader
 , Japanese sport shooter
 , Japanese volleyball player
 , Japanese poet
 , Japanese footballer
 , Japanese table tennis player
 , Japanese footballer
 , Japanese artist
 , Japanese baseball player
 , Japanese footballer
 , Japanese footballer
 , Japanese footballer
 , Japanese cross-country skier
 , Japanese middle-distance runner
 , Japanese ice dancer and coach
 , Japanese writer
 , Japanese academic and translator
 , Japanese anime director
 , Japanese footballer and manager
 , Japanese musician and record producer
 , Japanese motorcycle racer
 , Japanese footballer
 , Japanese golfer
 , Japanese politician
 , Japanese jazz saxophonist
 , Japanese writer for anime
 , Japanese actor
 , Japanese wrestling referee and writer
 , Japanese video game conceptor
 , Japanese composer
 Tina Takahashi, Canadian judoka
 Tomoko Takahashi (born 1966), Japanese artist
 , Japanese baseball player
 , Japanese pole vaulter
 , Japanese roboticist
 , Japanese baseball player
 , Japanese computer network researcher and businessman
 , Japanese racing driver
 , Japanese footballer
 , Japanese water polo player
 , Japanese manga artist
 Wes Takahashi, American animator and visual effects supervisor
 , Japanese writer
 , Japanese wheel gymnastics acrobat
 Yasuko Takahashi, commonly known as Izumi Aki
 , Japanese theoretical physicist
 , Japanese manga artist
 , Japanese film and television director
 , Japanese singer
 , Japanese mixed martial artist and kickboxer
 , Japanese boxer
 , Japanese long jumper
 , Japanese baseball player
 , Japanese manga artist
 , Japanese footballer
 , ring name of Kazuo Takahashi (born 1969), Japanese mixed martial artist
 , Japanese baseball player
 , Japanese manga artist
 , Japanese rugby union player
 , Japanese singer-songwriter
 , Japanese actress and model
 , Japanese voice actor
 , Japanese painter
 , Japanese Paralympic athlete
 , Japanese classical pianist, composer, critic and writer
 , Japanese footballer
 , Japanese professional wrestler
 , Japanese motorcycle racer
 , Japanese baseball player
 , Japanese sport wrestler
 , Japanese musician
 , Japanese volleyball and beach volleyball player
 , Japanese triathlete
 , Japanese footballer
 , Japanese actress and singer
 , Japanese weightlifter
 , Japanese tennis player
 , Japanese footballer
 , Japanese engineer
 , Japanese footballer
 , Japanese actor
 , Japanese Magic: The Gathering player

Fictional characters

 Daichi Takahashi and Eriko Takahashi, from High School Girls
 Kenshi Takahashi, from the Mortal Kombat series
 Misaki Takahashi, from Junjo Romantica
 Mitsuko Takahashi, from Someday's Dreamers
 , a character in the tokusatsu television series Gosei Sentai Dairanger
 Tetsuya Takahashi, from Forbidden Dance
 Nanami Takahashi, from the manga We Were There
 Mr. Takahashi, from Curb Your Enthusiasm
 Takeda Takahashi, from Mortal Kombat X
 Takahashi from Fallout 4
 Keisuke Takahashi from Initial D
 Ryosuke Takahashi from Initial D

References

Japanese-language surnames